
Gmina Miastków Kościelny is a rural gmina (administrative district) in Garwolin County, Masovian Voivodeship, in east-central Poland. Its seat is the village of Miastków Kościelny, which lies approximately 14 kilometres (9 mi) east of Garwolin and 68 km (42 mi) south-east of Warsaw.

Villages
Gmina Miastków Kościelny contains the villages and settlements of Brzegi, Glinki, Kruszówka, Kujawy, Miastków Kościelny, Oziemkówka, Przykory, Ryczyska, Stary Miastków, Wola Miastkowska, Zabruzdy, Zabruzdy-Kolonia, Zasiadały, Zgórze, Zwola and Zwola Poduchowna.

Neighbouring gminas
Gmina Miastków Kościelny is bordered by the gminas of Borowie, Górzno, Stoczek Łukowski, Wola Mysłowska and Żelechów.

References
Polish official population figures 2006

Miastkow Koscielny
Garwolin County